The Seventh Brother is a 1991 Hungarian-German-American animated fantasy-comedy-drama film for children made and produced at Hungary's Pannonia Film Studio. It was co-produced with Magyar Televízió, Germany's RealFilm, and the U.S. outlet Feature Films for Families.

Plot summary
The story begins in the forest, with the viewer being addressed by Dr. Albert E. Owl, a "famous storyteller". Noting that the viewer is lost in the forest, he decides to recount the tale of Tiny the puppy, the seventh brother (occasionally interspersing his story with various comments of his own).

The doctor's tale begins the previous spring, with Tiny the puppy riding in a car with his owner-a little girl named Angie-and her grandpa after an enjoyable trip to a big city. On the way home, their car breaks down in the middle of a storm and the grandpa goes out to fix it. Angie goes out to help, telling Tiny to stay in the car, but leaving the door open. Spotting a frog outside, Tiny goes after it, but falls down a hill (unbeknownst to his owners, who drive off without him and can't hear his barks over the storm). Heartbroken, he decides to wait out the storm by sleeping in a little hollowed-out area in a bush (sleeping through Angie calling for him, as she noticed his absence soon and told her grandpa to go back to find him).

The next morning, a band of rabbits discover Tiny. Their opinions on him are mixed (most of them believe Tiny to be some form of monster), but the leader of the group-the ruffian of the family, J.C. (his real name is Jerald Cuthbert)-feels that he should be left to survive on his own; luckily, one of his sisters, Joanna, decides that they should help him. She quickly convinces her siblings to join up after putting the matter to a vote with the other rabbits- Rebecca (the eldest sister), Mimi (the sensitive one), Cody (the glutton), Marty (the cautious one) -and Tiny is welcomed into the family as a "bunny-puppy". Tiny accepts, but on one condition- they must come back later to see if Angie came back. The bunnies agree and bring him back to their home following a musical number in which they introduce themselves. However, they teach him to act like a rabbit, such as hopping and keeping his ears up straight. J.C. is frustrated with Tiny because he doesn't act like a rabbit, but when J.C. is caught by a hawk, Tiny scares the hawk away by barking at it, causing it to fly away in a panic. Because of this, the family afterwards decides to accept Tiny as their brother, which makes the puppy very happy, although their parents are afraid at first.

The morning after, Miss Magpie, the nosy leader of the forest, is very scared of the news and tells her friend, Birdie, and the whole forest about it. Most of the forest is scared of Tiny at first, but when they see that he isn't vicious, the animals are relieved. The sole exception for this rule is Miss Magpie, who is still heavily convinced that he is a monster (mainly due to the fact that Tiny is a dog, a domesticated animal bred to hunt and kill animals and believing that he will do the same to them as soon as he is fully grown). When Tiny smells the scent of his owners and hears Angie calling for him, he runs up the hill to the road where he first met the bunnies. But when he arrives, he is too late, and thinks that his owners don't want him anymore (luckily, his new family is able to turn his frown upside down). Miss Magpie hires a fox named Mr. Fox to try and intimidate the rabbits, but Tiny teaches them to growl at him, which scares Mr. Fox and sends him running. Human poachers arrive in the forest to try and kill the bunnies, but the puppy teaches the rabbits to howl while hiding in their home, which send the poachers running.

Later that night, a flood reaches the bunnies' home. J.C. and his father stay in their hole trying to dig their way out while the other rabbits climb up a branch, but Cody is caught in the raging waters and Tiny jumps in. The puppy saves Cody, and the rabbits hop onto dry land, but J.C. and their dad are still in their hole trying to dig through as the water rises. Tiny senses them and digs a hole where they escape. Their father applauds Tiny, saying he is proud for him to be their son.

Winter is not far from arrival, and Miss Magpie mocks Tiny for being a dog, not knowing how to prepare for winter. Unfortunately for her, fortunes turn when a weasel tries to kill her because she failed to stop the rabbits. The weasel bites Tiny's leg, but he eventually throws the weasel into a pond. Fearing for his safety, Miss Magpie warns the rabbits. When the rabbits discover that Tiny is alive, they celebrate. But he is sick due to the effects of the bite (as well as being unable to survive on vegetation like all the other forest animals), and he is taken to see Dr. Owl, who tells the parents that he must be returned to his owners. The rabbits carry Tiny back home, but along the way, they come across a big crease between two hills. J.C. uses a large stick to successfully carry the family over the crease, and they finally reach his owners' home. As Tiny is dragged into his doghouse, the rabbits howl and then disappear, causing Angie to wonder if it's her puppy howling. When Angie sees Tiny, she and her grandpa are very happy to see him again and welcome him home.

Cast

Hungarian version
Csongor Szalay - Vacak
Balázs Simonyi - Tasli
Álmos Előd - Okoska
Balàzs Szvetlov - Malé
Kata Nemes-Takách - Karotta
Dani Halasi - Pufi
Zsófia Manya - Musz-Musz
Iván Verebély - Nyuszipapa
Györgyi Andai - Nyuszimama
Gyula Szabó - Bagoly
Károly Kassai - Szarka
György Simon - Nagypapa
Julcsi Szönyi - Ágnes
Vilmos Izsóf - Hugó
Endre Botár - Elek
Magdolna Menszátor - Anya
András Stohl - Sün
Tibor Kristóf - Héja
Péter Barbinek - Róka

German version
Constantin von Jascheroff - Bobo (Vacak)
Jan Steilen - Theo (Tasli)
Shalisar Haftchenari - Julchen (Okoska)
Matthias Ruschke - Maxie (Marty)
Lena Krüper - Karotta
Stanley Dannbrück - Puffer (Pufi)
Jana Raschke - Coco (Musz-Musz)
Theo Branding - Hubert (Nyuszipapa)
Beate Hasenau - Elster (Nyuszimama)
Renier Baaken - Opi (Nagypapa)
Katja Liebing - Angie (Ágnes)
Gerd Duwner, Joachim Kemmer, Claus Wilcke, Regine Albrecht, Gisela Ferber, Fabian Kärner, Michaela Kametz, Gerd Kilbinger, Jürg Löw, Lou Richter, Christian Rode, Friedrich Schoenfelder, Santiago Ziesmer, and Wolfgang Ziffer - Additional voices

English version
Aaron Bybee - Tiny (Vacak/Bobo)
Joey Lopez - J.C. (Tasli/Theo)
Christina Schaub - Rebecca (Okoska/Julchen)
Logan Hall - Marty (Malé/Maxie)
Laura Schulties - Joanna (Karotta) (credited as Laura Schulthies)
Andrew Soren - Cody (Pufi/Puffer)
Sarah Baker - Mimi (Musz-Musz/Coco)
Mary Sperry - Mrs. Rabbit (Nyuszimama/Elster)
Scott Wilkinson - Mr. Rabbit (Nyuszipapa/Hubert)/Poacher 3/Weasel
Joe Requa - Dr. Albert E. Owl (Bagoly)
Linda Bierman - Mrs. Magpie (Szarka)
Dick Canaday - Grandpa (Nagypapa/Opi)
Danielle Holliday - Angie (Ágnes)
Don A. Judd - Silly Crow (credited as Don Judd)
Mary Parker Williams - Mrs. Bird
Carson Boss - Mr. Bird
Jim Wright - Groundhog
Duane Stevens - Father Hedgehog (Sün)
Karily Baker - Whiny Hedgehog/Sniffing Mouse
Nate Gee - Spikey 2/Squirrel 3/Tiny 2 (Vacak 2/Bobo 2)
Justin Martin - Spikey 3/Squirrel 4
Richard Bugg - Fox (Róka)
Mark Probert - Hawk (Héja)
Rick Macy - Stork/Poacher 1 (Hugó)
Aaron Watson - Alf/Poacher 2 (Elek)
Aisha Mortimer - Squirrel 1
Lance Bradshaw - Squirrel 2
Wade Wisan - Squirrel 5
Sydney Lowry - Mouse
Mel Martin - Melk the Elk
Annie Baker - Forest Animal
Jacque Pace, Kaye Tolbert, Brooks Holm, Christy Peterson, Cindy Overstreet and Kerri Odom - Ladies Bird Group

Soundtrack

The Name Song
Music by Kurt Bestor, Sam Cardon, Merrill B. Jenson
The Danger's All Around Us
Music by Kurt Bestor, Sam Cardon, Merrill B. Jenson
There Is A Home
Music by Kurt Bestor, Sam Cardon, Merrill B. Jenson
I Miss You
Music by Kurt Bestor, Sam Cardon, Merrill B. Jenson

Release and reception
As a theatrical release, The Seventh Brother began in theaters on 21 June 1991 in Hungary and on 7 September 1992 in Germany. Feature Films for Families, one of the production companies, released it direct to video in the U.S. on 20 April 1994 in the United States.

The English version was re-edited from the German and Hungarian versions, with Angie and her grandfather being established to be Tiny's owners toward the start, and the reason why he disappeared was because he tried chasing a frog rather than being dumped by his old owner, and they even go to try and find him when they realize he's missing but are unable to do so. Another change involves Dr. Albert E. Owl's role being expanded to him being the film's narrator and framing device rather than just being a storyteller owl.

It was seen by over 150,000 viewers in Germany, and 3,042 in Switzerland's German-speaking region, during its original theatrical run.

Novelisations of the film have been published in Germany and Hungary.

References

Further reading

External links

1991 films
1991 animated films
1995 films
1996 films
1990s children's animated films
Animated films about dogs
Animated films about rabbits and hares
Hungarian animated films
Italian animated films
Hungarian children's films
Italian children's films
Fictional dogs
Films set in forests
German animated films
German children's films
1990s German films
Alternative versions of films